Rabi may refer to:

Places
 Rábí, a castle in the Czech Republic
 Rabí, a village in the Czech Republic
 Räbi, a village in Estonia
 Rabi, Panchthar, a village development committee in Nepal
 Rabi Island, a volcanic island in northern Fiji

People
RABI (artist) (David Torres; born 1984), American visual artist
Abd al-Malik ibn Rabi, a narrator of hadith
Al-Rabi ibn Abu al-Huqayq (fl. 622), Jewish poet of the Banu al-Nadir in Medina
Al-Rabi ibn Khuthaym (died c. 682), tabi'i ascetic of Kufa
Amir Hossein Rabii (died 1979), Iranian Air Force commander
Ashur-rabi II (1013 BC–972 BC), Assyrian king
Isidor Isaac Rabi (1898–1988), Nobel Prize-winning Austrian-American physicist
Kenana ibn al-Rabi (7th century), Jewish tribal leader and opponent of Muhammad
Rabi'ah ibn al-Harith (c.566-c.640), sahaba (companion) of Muhammad
Rabia Balkhi (10th century), Persian poet
Rabi Ghosh (1931–1997), Indian actor
Rabi ibn Sabra, a narrator of hadith
Rabi ibn Sabih, Islamic scholar
Rabi Maharaj (born 1947), Trinidadian author and speaker
Rabi Pirzada (born 1992), Pakistani pop singer
Rabi Thapa (fl. 2010–2016), Nepali writer and editor working in English
Rabindranath Tagore (1861–1941), Bengali poet, philosopher and polymath
Saʽad ibn ar-Rabiʽ, sahaba (companion) of Muhammad
Umar ibn Abi Rabi'ah (644–712/719), Arabic poet 
Utbah ibn Rabi'ah (c.563–624), pagan leader of the Quraysh during the era of Muhammad

Characters
 Rabi, or Lavi, a character from the D. Gray-man manga series
 Rabi, one of the three main characters from Madö King Granzört
 Rabī or Lavie, a character from the Sgt. Frog anime series

Other uses
 "RABi", a song by Bon Iver from the 2019 album I, I
 Rabi crop, a spring harvest in South Asia
 Rabi cycle, in physics is the cyclic behavior of a two-state quantum system in the presence of an oscillatory driving field
 Rabi problem, concerns the response of an atom to an applied harmonic electric field, with an applied frequency very close to the atom's natural frequency

See also 
 Rabbi (disambiguation)
 Rabies
 Ravi (disambiguation)